Rehan Khan (born 8 January 1990) is an Indian cricketer. He made his List A debut for Bihar in the 2018–19 Vijay Hazare Trophy on 19 September 2018. He made his first-class debut for Bihar in the 2018–19 Ranji Trophy on 6 December 2018.

References

External links
 

1990 births
Living people
Indian cricketers
Bihar cricketers
Place of birth missing (living people)